This is a list of members of the Victorian Legislative Assembly from 6 September 1921 to 28 May 1924, as elected at the 1921 state election and subsequent by-elections:

 On 13 July 1922, the Nationalist member for Gippsland South, Thomas Livingston, died. Nationalist candidate Walter West won the resulting by-election on 18 August 1922.
 On 8 July 1923, the Nationalist member for Daylesford, Donald McLeod, died. Labor candidate James McDonald won the resulting by-election on 9 August 1923, but was defeated in a September recount by Donald McLeod's son Roderick McLeod.
 On 28 December 1923, the Nationalist member for Dalhousie, Allan Cameron, died. Labor candidate Reg Pollard won the resulting by-election on 31 January 1924.
 On 6 April 1924, the Nationalist member for Gippsland West, Sir John Mackey, died. Victorian Farmers Union candidate Arthur Walter won the resulting by-election on 23 May 1924.

Sources
 Re-member (a database of all Victorian MPs since 1851). Parliament of Victoria.

Members of the Parliament of Victoria by term
20th-century Australian politicians